Gelon is an urban-type settlement in the Shakhrisabz district of the Qashqadaryo Region of the Republic of Uzbekistan.

The kishlak was founded in 1305. The inhabitants of the village still preserve ancient customs and way of life. Until mid-2018, foreign tourists could not visit this village due to the special border regime.

Geography 
Gelon is located in the southern part of Uzbekistan in the Qashqadaryo, on the western slope of the Pamir-Alai Mountains.

The territory is located on the border of Uzbekistan and Tajikistan, 80 kilometers from Shakhrisabz. The kishlak is surrounded on all sides by high mountains, reaching an altitude of more than 4000 meters in the east. This is one of the highest mountain villages in Uzbekistan. It is not easy to get here along a difficult but picturesque mountain dirt road with numerous serpentines.

Climate 
The climate is continental, dry, and in some places subtropical.

Population 
The population of the village is 5834 people (2019).

Ethnic composition: Tajiks  - 5831 people, Uzbeks  - 3 people. (as of December 12, 2019).

Interesting fact 

Gelon is located at an altitude of 2600 meters above sea level. In the vicinity of village there are practically no even and flat plots of land where it is possible to use tractor, and peasants are forced to cultivate potato fields on steep, which reach 40 degrees, mountain slopes almost by hand, using the simplest plow harnessed by a pair of bulls or donkeys. Orchards are also cultivated on steep slopes and river gorges.

A special pride of the inhabitants of the village is an extensive irrigation network of man-made canals laid on the mountain slopes for tens of kilometers. The most famous mountain potato in Uzbekistan grows here. Particularly exotic is the central part of the village with old houses and narrow streets.

There are no other places in Uzbekistan where, in the layout of houses, the second floor of the house is residential, and the first floor is used for keeping livestock. The same architecture is used in Tibet and in the highlands of Nepal.
In the village, tourists can communicate and get acquainted with the way of life of the inhabitants, walk for 1–3 days in the picturesque surroundings, as well as in the neighboring villages of Kul, Sarchashma.

People here are of Tajik origin, according to some signs, Gelon is a historical, ancient place in which there were many battles. Mazaorns, who fought for the Islamic religion in Central Asia, are buried here. In World War II, more than 88 people went to the front from the village of Gelon, of whom only a couple of people came. Near the settlement, there are several more urban-type settlements - these are Kul, Sarchashma, Shut, Tajiks and Uzbeks also live there.

The Kashkadarya or Gelon river flows through the gelon, which goes along the canals to the main reservoir of Shakhrisabz. There are also interesting personalities in the village, for example: local artists, musicians, who actively take part in various events, weddings.

The village has the longest life among similar villages, such as: Kul, Shut. The village itself is considered the richest in the Kashkadarya region. The main activities in Gelon are planting potatoes, growing watermelons, fruits and raising livestock. All residents of the village have a Muslim religion, they also hold weddings according to the Muslim Sharia. Girls get married right after 18 years. A resident of Gelon is obliged to keep his wife clean and safe, read the sacred prayer every day, do not drink alcohol and do not smoke. At the beginning of the 20th century, when the revolution began, Bosmachi came to the village, who resisted the invaders of the Soviet Union, as a result, Bosmachi became bandits, moraders and robbers.

Tourism 
Near the village Gelon, at an altitude of 4080 meters above sea level, there is a holy mountain "Hazrati Sultan", where thousands of tourists come to pray. Also in the village you can visit one of the most spectacular and abundant waterfalls in Uzbekistan, a 40-meter waterfall "Suvtushar", as well as tourists can enjoy the picturesque mountain peaks, visit several mosques.

Transport 
There are several tourist buses in Gelon, until 1989 in Gelon there were open flights on Helicopter, from Shakhrisabz taxis go. At the moment, only tourist buses, or fixed-route taxis, or similar city-type taxis run.

COVID-19 
The pandemic was also felt in this high-mountain village, which until then was visited by numerous tourists during the season, who stayed in several guest houses functioning here. It is understandable that families who received income from tourism were in a difficult position. With the announcement of a lockdown in Uzbekistan, a checkpoint was set up at the entrance barrier, through which no outsiders were allowed to enter. Thus, there was not a single case of infection in the village.

life expectancy 
At the moment, the village is the longest-lived, its inhabitants reach 85–90 years, which is a huge number compared to other populations that are close to this village. Here you can easily see a person who is over 85, and he will be a board of health and strength. The mountain part does its job, people here, even as adults, feel free, confident and good.

Politics 
The political situation in the village was difficult, but the death of the former president Islam Karimov, tourist areas in the village were closed in the country, this area was guarded by the CIS, after the arrival of the new president, new rules entered into politics, it was allowed to vote for the leader of the village, participate in politics, and engage in political affairs.

Since 2021, elections for the position of Mayor of the village have begun, "Jabborov Safarmurod Sattorovich" won the main elections, received more than 80% of the votes from the residents of the village.

Education 
There are 2 schools in the village, a children's department from grades 1-4, also from grades 5-11. Children, after studying in the village, have to travel in the city to receive higher professional education, since there are no state universities, colleges or similar institutions in the village

Sights 
There is a mountain near the village, which bears the name "Hazrati Sultan", as well as "Hisorak Suv Ombori", which is a popular place among tourists.

Gallery

Notes 

 
Regions of Uzbekistan